Nikifarovo (Nikifar) is a rural locality (a selo) and the administrative center of Nikifarovsky Selsoviet, Alsheyevsky District, Bashkortostan, Russia. The population was 845 as of 2010. There are eight streets.

Geography 
Nikifarovo is located 46 km southwest of Rayevsky (the district's administrative centre) by road. Gayniyamak is the nearest rural locality.

References 

Rural localities in Alsheyevsky District